Kirtley Fletcher Mather (February 13, 1888May 5, 1978) was an American geologist and faculty member at Harvard University.  An expert on petroleum geology and mineralogy, Mather was a prominent scholar, advocate for academic freedom, social activist, and critic of McCarthyism.  He is known for his efforts to harmonize the dialogue between science and religion, his role in the Scopes "Monkey Trial", his faith-based liberal activism, support for adult education programs and advocacy for civil liberties.

Early life
Kirtley Mather was the second of six children born to William Green Mather (1855–1937) and Julia Sabrina King (1860–1938).  William Mather was the son of a Baptist minister. Mather is related to Increase and Cotton Mather, well known New England Puritan ministers.  They are all directly descended from Rev. Richard Mather. The family’s religious heritage would be significant in forming young Mather’s social conscience.

Mather was born and grew up in Chicago, Illinois and graduated from South Chicago High School in 1904.  After completing his first two years of undergraduate studies at the University of Chicago, he transferred to Denison University, where the school had a strong Baptist heritage and his older brother was a student. After graduating from Denison in 1909, he returned to the University of Chicago, where he completed his Ph.D. degree in 1915.

Career

As an academic scientist, Mather's areas of expertise were in the fields of petroleum geology and mineralogy.  His teaching career began at the University of Arkansas (1911–1914), while he was still in his doctoral program.  After completing his graduate studies, he held faculty positions at Queen's University (1915–1918) and Denison University (1918–1924), before beginning a 30-year teaching career at Harvard University in 1924. For a period of time during his tenure at Harvard, he served as chairman of the geology department. In addition to his teaching duties at Harvard, he served as the Director of the Harvard Summer School from 1933 through 1938. During his retirement in Albuquerque, he served as a visiting faculty member at the University of New Mexico.

Mather was an energetic proponent of readily accessible adult education programs. Although he was associated with an elite university for 30 years, he believed that the interests of democracy were more closely associated with adult literacy and education programs for all citizens. Mather was a highly visible supporter of Dorothy Hewitt and the Boston Center for Adult Education she founded.

Mather was entrusted with leadership responsibilities for several national professional organizations. In 1938, he served as the head of the Association of Summer Session Deans and Directors. In 1951, he became a member of the board of trustees for Science Service, now known as Society for Science & the Public. He served as board president of the American Association for the Advancement of Science from 1948-1956 and the American Academy of Arts and Sciences from 1957–1961. For his scholarship in the field of geology, he was awarded the Cullum Geographical Medal in 1965. Additionally, in 1964, for his book The Earth Beneath Us, Mather received the Edison Award for the best science book for young people and the Book Award of the Geographic Society of Chicago.

Scopes "Monkey Trial"
Mather is known for his role in the 1925 Scopes "Monkey Trial". For the trial he submitted a deposition for the defense and helped Clarence Darrow rehearse his questioning of William Jennings Bryan. Mather's biographer, Kennard Bork, notes this in relation to Mather's involvement with the trial: By 1924 Mather had already perceived the threat of biblical literalism as used by some segments of the religious Right. Offended by methods and claims of the anti-evolutionists, he declared that his love of religion, as well as his commitment to science, drove him to oppose William Jennings Bryan and the prosecutors of organic evolution.

Links to two video interviews with Mather regarding the trial are included in the External links section below.

Academic freedom and social activism

Mather became well known for his commitment to progressive social causes, serving as the first president of Promoting Enduring Peace. From the academy, to the court room and on the national stage, Mather was a determined advocate and activist for academic freedom and human rights. A harbinger of Mather’s willingness to stakeout unpopular positions in the service of academic freedom is what his biographer, Kennard Bork refers to as the “Kornhauser Affair” at Denison University in 1922. In this instance Mather championed the cause of Professor Sidney I. Kornhauser whose failure to achieve tenure was perceived by many colleagues to involve anti-semitic or anti-liberal bias among some university supporters and members of the administration. Kornhauser went on to a distinguished teaching career at the University of Louisville, where the medical school’s library bears his name.

Massachusetts Teachers’ Oath
Mather took a leadership role in resisting the Massachusetts Teachers' Oath of 1935.
 The loyalty oath was adopted by the Massachusetts state legislature and enforced by Harvard President James B. Conant. The entire affair contributed to efforts by Mather and fellow Harvard faculty members like F.O. Matthiessen and Max Lerner to form the Cambridge Union of University Teachers, Harvard’s chapter of the American Federation of Teachers.

In 1937, Mather co-founded the Institute for Propaganda Analysis with Edward A. Filene and Clyde R. Miller. From 1946 to 1949, Mather was chairman of the Massachusetts Civil Liberties Union. He was described by the Harvard Crimson as an "outspoken critic of McCarthyism". A measure of the Red Scare price that Mather would pay for his activism is reflected in the April 4, 1949, issue of Life magazine. In an article subsection titled Dupes and Fellow Travelers Dress Up Communist Fronts, Mather is pictured among 50 prominent academics, scientists, clergy and writers, including Albert Einstein, Arthur Miller, Lillian Hellman, Langston Hughes, Norman Mailer and fellow Harvard professors, F.O. Matthiessen, Corliss Lamont and Ralph Barton Perry.

Personal life
Mather was married twice, first to Marie Porter Mather from 1912 until her death in 1971. They were parents to three daughters, Florence (1916–2006), Julia (1920–1986) and Jean. Florence married Sherman Wengard, who taught petroleum geology at the University of New Mexico. Julia “Judy” was on the staff at Denison University and married to LeRoy Seils, former athletic director at Denison. Jean married Dean W. Seibel.

He married Muriel Williams Mather in 1977. They were together until his death. Upon his retirement from Harvard in 1954, he and Marie traveled widely around the world, finally settling in Albuquerque, New Mexico, where he resided until his death at the age of 90. During his retirement years in Albuquerque, he served as a visiting faculty member at the University of New Mexico.  Mather died in 1978 in Albuquerque and is buried in Granville, Ohio.

Legacy
Mather was an accomplished scientist and academic who took progressive and often controversial stands on issues of academic freedom and human rights. In addition to the legacy of his scholarship, he stands among prominent twentieth century American scientists who sought to harmonize the dialogue between science and religion and to ally himself with progressive social causes. Archives of his research and correspondence are held by both the University of Chicago and Denison University.

In 1982, Lynn Elfner reflected on the Scopes Trial and Mather's legacy:
Mather's motivation throughout most of his life was the defense of civil liberties and the academic freedom of many of his colleagues. His education was not in jurisprudence; rather, it was grounded in basic geology and was greatly aided by extensive field experience over much of the earth. To this must be added a great love of people and an unusual ability to persuade and influence others to his views. He was a rare individual who successfully bridged the gap between science and religion. He was comfortable and respected in both camps. Today his wisdom and authority are more important than ever.

Kirtley Mather’s remarkable career long efforts in the fields of science, religion, education and civil liberties brought him recognition, criticism and honor.

Published works
 1922:  Front Ranges of the Andes between Santa Cruz, Bolivia, and Embarcación, Argentina, Geological Society of America Bulletin, v.33, p. 703-764 
 1928:  Old Mother Earth
 1928:  Science in Search of God
 1930:  Sons of the Earth
 1932:  Physiography and Quaternary Geology of the San Juan Mountains, Colorado (with W.W. Atwood): U.S. Geology Survey, Professional Paper 166
 1934:  Laboratory Manual of Physical and Historical Geology (with C.J. Roy)
 1937:  Adult Education: A Dynamic for Democracy (with Dorothy Hewitt), Appleton-Century, New York
 1939:  A Source Book in Geology, 1400-1900 (edited with S.L. Mason), originally published by McGraw Hill, 1939, subsequently published by Harvard University Press, 1967, 
 1944:  Enough and to Spare 1949:  Crusade for Life, The John Calvin McNair Lectures, University of North Carolina
 1950:  A Laboratory Manual for Geology: I (with C.J. Roy and L.R. Thiesmeyer), Physical Geology
 1952:  A Laboratory Manual for Geology, II (with C.J. Roy), Historical Geology
 1961:  The World In Which We Live 1964:  The Earth Beneath Us, photos by Josef Muench, drawings by Howard Morris, Random House,  (translated into French, German, Italian and Dutch; winner of the 1964 Thomas A. Edison Award and the 1964 Book Award of the Geographic Society of Chicago. A revised edition was published in 1975
 1967:  A Source Book in Geology, 1900-1950, (editor), Harvard University Press, 1969, 

BiographyCracking Rocks and Defending Democracy: Kirtley Fletcher Mather, scientist, teacher, social activist, 1888–1978, Kennard Baker Bork, Ph.D., Pacific Division, American Association for the Advancement of Science, 1994, 

References

External links

 A Scientist Concerned About Society: Kirtley F. Mather (1888-1978) The Geological Society of America, GSA Today'', July 1996
 
 
 The Permissive Universe Paul B. Sears, 1986, University of New Mexico Press
 
Guide to the Kirtley Fletcher Mather Papers 1943-1946 at the University of Chicago Special Collections Research Center

1888 births
1978 deaths
Harvard University faculty
Recipients of the Cullum Geographical Medal
20th-century American geologists
Denison University alumni
Denison University faculty
Writers about religion and science